Best Home Cook (previously Britain's Best Home Cook) is a competitive cooking show produced by KEO Films and distributed internationally by Endemol Shine Group. It premiered on BBC One in May 2018, presented by Claudia Winkleman, with judges Mary Berry, Chris Bavin, and Dan Doherty. A second series, with "Britain's" dropped from the title and Angela Hartnett replacing Doherty, returned in January 2020. The series was created in the wake of Berry's previous show, The Great British Bake Off, departing the BBC for Channel 4, and has received mixed reviews from critics. The programme was axed in 2022.

Series 1 (2018)

Cooks

Elimination table

 (WINNER) This cook won the competition.
 (RUNNER-UP) This cook finished in second place.
 (ULT) The cook was one of the judges' favourites in the ultimate challenge.
 The cook got through to the next round.
 (E) The cook was in the elimination round, but not eliminated.
 (OUT) The cook was eliminated.

Series 2 (2020)

Cooks

Elimination table

 Because the judges were unable to decide on the worst dish during the elimination challenge, no-one was eliminated this week. As a result, two cooks were eliminated the following week.

 Oli was not well enough to compete in the Rustle-up challenge and was automatically placed into the elimination challenge.

 (WINNER) This cook won the competition.
 (RUNNER-UP) This cook finished in second place.
 (3RD PLACE) This cook finished in third place.
 (ULT) The cook was one of the judges' favourites in the ultimate challenge.
 The cook got through to the next round.
 (E) The cook was in the elimination round, but not eliminated.
 (OUT) The cook was eliminated.

Celebrity series (2021)

Celebrities

Elimination table

 Because the judges were unable to decide on the worst dish during the elimination challenge, no-one was eliminated this week.

 (WINNER) This cook won the competition.
 (RUNNER-UP) This cook finished in second place.
 (3RD PLACE) This cook finished in third place.
 (ULT) The cook was one of the judges' favourites in the ultimate challenge.
 The cook got through to the next round.
 (E) The cook was in the elimination round, but not eliminated.
 (OUT) The cook was eliminated.

References

External links 
 
 Celebrity Best Home Cook
 
 
 

BBC television game shows
British cooking television shows
2010s British game shows
2020s British game shows
2018 British television series debuts
English-language television shows
2010s British cooking television series
2020s British cooking television series